The  United States Maritime Service Training Station at Sheepshead Bay was opened on September 1, 1942.  It closed on February 28, 1954.

The station was the largest maritime training station during World War II and was equipped to train 30,000 merchant seamen each year.  The site is now occupied by Kingsborough Community College, and has been since the mid-1960s.

See also 
 Manhattan Beach Air Force Station (1954-1959)
 Manhattan Beach Coast Guard Training Station

References 

United States Merchant Marine
Manhattan Beach, Brooklyn
Maritime colleges in the United States
Educational institutions established in 1942
Educational institutions disestablished in 1954
Coney Island
Defunct universities and colleges in New York (state)
1942 establishments in New York City
Military facilities in Brooklyn